Endotricha melanchroa is a species of snout moth in the genus Endotricha. It is found in northern and western Australia.

References

Moths described in 1911
Endotrichini